Cyrtarachne is a genus of orb-weaver spiders first described by Tamerlan Thorell in 1868.

Species
 it contains fifty-five species:
C. akirai Tanikawa, 2013 – China, Korea, Taiwan, Japan
C. avimerdaria Tikader, 1963 – India
C. bengalensis Tikader, 1961 – India, China
C. bicolor Thorell, 1898 – Myanmar
C. bigibbosa Simon, 1907 – São Tomé and Príncipe, Equatorial Guinea (Bioko)
C. bilunulata Thorell, 1899 – Cameroon
C. biswamoyi Tikader, 1961 – India
C. bufo (Bösenberg & Strand, 1906) – China, Korea, Japan
C. cingulata Thorell, 1895 – Myanmar
C. conica O. Pickard-Cambridge, 1901 – Malaysia
C. dimidiata Thorell, 1895 – Myanmar
C. fangchengensis Yin & Zhao, 1994 – China
C. finniganae Lessert, 1936 – Mozambique
C. flavopicta Thorell, 1899 – Cameroon, Equatorial Guinea
C. friederici Strand, 1911 – New Guinea
C. gibbifera Simon, 1899 – Indonesia (Sumatra)
C. gilva Yin & Zhao, 1994 – China
C. grubei (Keyserling, 1864) – Mauritius
C. guttigera Simon, 1909 – Vietnam
C. heminaria Simon, 1909 – Vietnam
C. histrionica Thorell, 1898 – Myanmar
C. hubeiensis Yin & Zhao, 1994 – China
C. ignava Thorell, 1895 – Myanmar
C. inaequalis Thorell, 1895 – India, China, Korea, Myanmar
C. invenusta Thorell, 1891 – India (Nicobar Is.)
C. ixoides (Simon, 1870) – Mediterranean, Caucasus, Madagascar
C. jucunda Tanikawa, 2013 – Japan
C. lactea Pocock, 1898 – East Africa
C. laevis Thorell, 1877 – Indonesia (Sumatra, Flores, Sulawesi)
C. latifrons Hogg, 1900 – Australia (Victoria)
Cyrtarachne l. atuberculata Hogg, 1900 – Australia (Victoria)
C. lepida Thorell, 1890 – Indonesia (Sumatra)
C. madagascariensis Emerit, 2000 – Madagascar
C. melanoleuca Ono, 1995 – Thailand
C. melanosticta Thorell, 1895 – Myanmar
C. menghaiensis Yin, Peng & Wang, 1994 – China
C. nagasakiensis Strand, 1918 – India, China, Korea, Japan
C. nodosa Thorell, 1899 – Cameroon, Equatorial Guinea (Bioko), Yemen
C. pallida O. Pickard-Cambridge, 1885 – China (Yarkand)
C. perspicillata (Doleschall, 1859) – Sri Lanka, Indonesia (Sumatra, Java), New Guinea
Cyrtarachne p. possoica Merian, 1911 – Indonesia (Sulawesi)
C. promilai Tikader, 1963 – India
C. raniceps Pocock, 1900 – India, Sri Lanka
C. rubicunda L. Koch, 1871 – Australia (New South Wales)
C. schmidi Tikader, 1963 – India, China
C. sinicola Strand, 1942 – China
C. sundari Tikader, 1963 – India
C. sunjoymongai Ahmed, Sumukha, Khalap, Mohan & Jadhav, 2015 – India
C. szetschuanensis Schenkel, 1963 – China
C. termitophila Lawrence, 1952 – Congo
C. tricolor (Doleschall, 1859) – Indonesia (Moluccas) to Australia
Cyrtarachne t. aruana Strand, 1911 – Indonesia (Aru Is.)
C. tuladepilachna Barrion & Litsinger, 1995 – Philippines
C. xanthopyga Kulczyński, 1911 – New Guinea
C. yunoharuensis Strand, 1918 – China, Korea, Japan

References

Araneidae
Araneomorphae genera
Spiders of Africa
Spiders of Asia
Taxa named by Tamerlan Thorell